Prachi Tehlan (born 2 October 1993) is an Indian former netball and basketball player, and an actress. Prachi is the former captain of the India national netball team which represented India in the 2010 Commonwealth Games and in other major Asian Championships in 2010-11. Under her captaincy, the Indian team won its first medal in 2011 South Asian Beach Games. She has been given the title of “Queen of The Court” by The Times of India & “Lass of The Rings” by The Indian Express. She is the brand ambassador of Netball Development Trust India for 2011-2017.

She made her acting debut in the TV series Diya Aur Baati Hum on Star Plus in January 2016.
She made her film debut as Nimmy in the Punjabi film Arjan opposite Roshan Prince directed by Manduip Singh in 2017.

Early life and education
Tehlan did her schooling from Montfort Senior Secondary School, Delhi. She graduated in B.Com (Hons.) from Jesus and Mary College, University of Delhi and completed her PG Diploma in Marketing Management from Institute of Management Technology, Ghaziabad. She had enrolled in Maharaja Agrasen Institute of Management Studies, GGSIP University, Delhi where she completed her Masters in Business Administration (HR and Marketing).

She has worked on various projects in Development Bank of Singapore, Deloitte, Accenture and 1800Sports.in. She is contributing to a project named UDAAN - Skills to Succeed for Mobilization, Training and Employment of youth from Jammu and Kashmir under National Skill Development Council, Delhi.

Sports career
She started her sports career with basketball playing at the national level while still in school. She was selected to attend the Indian Camp thrice in 2004, in Cuttack, Odisha.

Basketball
2002-2007
Played 2 sub junior nationals (under-14), Pondicherry and Karnataka. (2002–03) 
Represented Delhi 8 times in under-17 category out of which the team secured a position three times. Played on the grounds of- Kotkapura (Punjab), Chittoor (AP), Gotan (Rajasthan), Kangra (HP), Ajmer (Rajasthan), Jaisalmer (Rajasthan), Chandigarh, Raipur (Chhattisgarh), Hyderabad etc.
Represented Delhi 3 times in under-19 category and secured 1st position all the three times. Played on the grounds of Delhi.
2008
2008: Secured 1st position in Basketball inter-college and got 1st position in Inter University in Bhubaneshwar and All India in Nelloor
2009
2009: Secured 1st position in inter-college Basketball and participated in Inter University held in Punjab.

Netball

Won a Gold Medal in 34th 2011 National Games.
Played Inter College thrice and scored 1st position.
Represented Delhi in Senior Nationals.
Played Indo-Singapore series, 2010 held in Delhi & Noida, won it by 5-0.
Captain of the team in 7th Youth Asian Championship, 2010 held in Delhi.
Participated and captained the Senior Indian Netball Team in the 2010 Commonwealth Games held in Delhi.
Represented India and was captain of the senior team in 6th Nation Cup, Singapore-2010.
Represented India and was captain of Indian team in 2011 South Asian Beach Games. The team bagged a silver medal. This was the first ever medal won by Indian team at an international level.

Acting career
Prachi decided to accept an offer from Shashi Sumeet Productions and make her acting debut with side character role in the highly rated TV drama Diya Aur Baati Hum, on Star Plus channel in January 2016. She lost 15 kg (33 lbs) of weight to prepare for the role. Prachi stated her reasons to put her sporting career on hold due to the lack of opportunities and sponsors for female players of netball and basketball in India. 
In 2017, she played a leading actress role in the Punjabi movie Bailaras . She was last seen in Malayalam movie Mamangam (2019)  Tehlan was considered for one of the lead female roles in Ram opposite Mohanlal.

Personal life
In August 2020, Prachi Tehlan married Delhi-based Rohit Saroha in Delhi. They got seprated in January 2022 after she filed A Complaint In Delhi Police against her husband Rohit Saroha for domestic violence.

Filmography

Films

Television

Recognition 
 India won its first international medal under her captaincy in South Asian Beach Games, 2011 (Oct), Sri Lanka.
 Youngest Captain of any Netball in the Commonwealth Games 2010.
 Awarded as Sports Women of the Year 2010 by Jesus and Mary College and recognized as a Sports Achiever in Delhi University Achievers List.
 Short films made by Delhi Ajtak, Pragya T.V, Focus T.V, Living India by Ayur Group and NDTV. (2010, 2011)
 Subject of various articles published by leading newspapers, magazines and internet-
 NDTV (2011) featured as one of the top 10 Hottest Sports Women in India.
 India Today (2010) featured as one of the Top 10 Glamorous faces of Commonwealth Games-2010.
 Sports Keeda (2010),
 Cupid speaks(2010),
 Hindustan Times (2010),
 Times of India (2010), article “Queen of the Courts”.
 Amar Ujala (2010,2011);
 Indian Express (2005), article “Lass of the Rings”.
 Chief Guest on various sports meets and social events(2010- 2012)
 Chief Guest at IIM Kashipur sports meet (2016)
 Guru Gobind Singh Indraprastha University Sports Meet (2010) with Sushil Kumar and Dhanraj Pillay
 Terry For Marathon with Satpal Singh and Mohammad Azruddin (2010)
 Guest at Limca Book of Records with Vijender Singh, Jwala Gutta, Gagan Narang, Mary Kom, Sushil Kumar, etc.(2011)
 Chal Leh Bhag Leh Sports Event
 Deepalaya School Sports Meet (2011)
 Dev Samaj School Sports Meet (2012)
 KAPSONS for its Brand Promotion, Kirti Nagar, 2012

See also
 Sana Dua

References

External links
 
 Prachi Tehlan Biography
 Official Website
 

Living people
1993 births
Sportswomen from Delhi
Indian netballers
Commonwealth Games competitors for India
Netball players at the 2010 Commonwealth Games
South Asian Beach Games silver medalists for India
South Asian Beach Games medalists in netball
Punjabi people
Indian film actresses
Indian television actresses
Indian soap opera actresses
Actresses in Hindi television
Actresses from New Delhi
Female models from Delhi
Actresses in Punjabi cinema
Actresses in Malayalam cinema
Actresses in Telugu cinema
21st-century Indian actresses
21st-century Indian women
21st-century Indian people